{{Infobox person
| name         = John Carter
| image        = Actor_John_Carter_(NTY_obit).jpg
| alt          =
| caption      =  Carter was known for his role as Vic Phillips in the 1983 film Scarface and played Stephen F. Austin in 1969 on Death Valley Days.
| birth_date   = 
| birth_place  = Center RidgeConway CountyArkansas, U.S
| death_date   = 
| death_place  = New York City, U.S
| occupation   = Actor
| years_active = 1967–2006
| spouse       = Barbara Williams (married 1955-1966, divorced) (1 child)
 Kendall T. Fewel (married 1993-2015, his death)
|relatives     = Conlan Carter (brother)
}}

John Carter (November 26, 1927  – May 23, 2015) was an American actor known for the films Badlands (1973), Scarface (1983), and The Hoax (2006). He may be best remembered for his recurring role as Police Lieutenant John Biddle on the television series Barnaby Jones (1973-1980). (Before that, he had played a different character, a homicide victim, in an early episode of the series.) He also directed two Barnaby Jones episodes.

Biography
Born in Center Ridge in Conway County in central Arkansas, Carter was the older brother of actor Conlan Carter of the ABC television series, Combat!. John Carter had his first TV role in that series, playing a major in the fifth-season episode "Nightmare on the Red Ball Run".  In 1967, he was part of an extensive cast in the TV Western Gunsmoke as Doyle in "Ladies From St. Louis" (S12E27).

Carter played an historical figure, Stephen F. Austin, in the 1969 episode "Here Stands Bailey" of the syndicated series Death Valley Days''.

Carter died from pneumonia on May 23, 2015, at the age of 87.

Filmography

References

External links 

1927 births
2015 deaths
Male actors from Arkansas
American male film actors
American male television actors
People from Conway County, Arkansas
Male actors from Los Angeles
Male actors from New York City
20th-century American male actors